Machikoppa is a small village in Chikkamagaluru District, Karnataka, South India.

References 

Villages in Chikkamagaluru district